Kaushal Samaraweera Lokuarachchi (born 20 May 1982), or Kaushal Lokuarachchi, is a former Sri Lankan cricketer, who played all formats. He is a right-handed batsman and a legbreak bowler. He was banned by BPL anti-corruption tribunal for 18 months and not involved in cricket since then.

International career
Having made an exceptional start to his career as an allrounder when he was a schoolboy, Lokuarachchi was made part of the Sri Lankan squad after the 2003 Cricket World Cup. He is primarily a leg-spinner, and it was thought that he would be able to capture a regular place in the team. However, having suffered from a car crash in August 2003 which killed a woman , he was given a four-month disciplinary ban by the Sri Lankan cricket board.

Having made his return steadily in the 2004 Provincial Tournament, he drifted back into the team, and having seen Muttiah Muralitharan suffer from a shoulder injury he captured a place in the team for the one-day series against South Africa in the Champions Trophy.

Arrest
Lokuarachchi was arrested after being involved in a motor vehicle accident which killed a pedestrian and injured her son in April 2003. He claimed that he had fallen asleep while driving. He was subsequently banned for four months by BCCSL.

Ban
In June 2014, Lokuarachchi was banned from cricket for 18 months by the Bangladesh Premier League Anti Corruption Tribunal for failing to report an approach by a bookie.

See also
 List of bowlers who have taken a wicket with their first ball in a format of international cricket

References

External links
 
 Cricinfo Article on his Arrest
 Cricinfo Article on his banning

1982 births
Living people
Sri Lanka One Day International cricketers
Sri Lanka Test cricketers
Sri Lanka Twenty20 International cricketers
Sri Lankan cricketers
Bloomfield Cricket and Athletic Club cricketers
Sinhalese Sports Club cricketers
Wayamba cricketers
Alumni of St. Peter's College, Colombo
Basnahira cricketers
Kandurata Warriors cricketers
Dhaka Dominators cricketers
Cricketers at the 2010 Asian Games
Cricketers banned for corruption
Asian Games competitors for Sri Lanka